CP-94253 is a drug which acts as a potent and selective serotonin 5-HT1B receptor agonist, with approximately 25x and 40x selectivity over the closely related 5-HT1D and 5-HT1A receptors. It has a range of behavioral effects, based on animal testing. The effects include the following: promoting wakefulness by increasing dopamine release in the brain; reducing food intake and promoting satiety; enhancing the reinforcing effects of cocaine; and possible antidepressant effects. A recent study found that "Regardless of sex, CP94253 decreased cocaine intake after abstinence and during resumption of SA [self-administration] and decreased cue reactivity" suggesting that agonism of the inhibitory 5-HT2B receptors may diminish the cognitive reward of cocaine usage and increased use of the drug without a period of abstinence may be a product of test subjects trying to achieve a previously rewarding experience through larger dosages of cocaine.

References 

Serotonin receptor agonists
Phenol ethers
Tetrahydropyridines
Pfizer brands